Cieszyno  is a village in the administrative district of Gmina Złocieniec, within Drawsko County, West Pomeranian Voivodeship, in north-western Poland.

During World War II the Germans established and operated a forced labour camp for prisoners of war of various nationalities in the village.

References

Cieszyno